The OQ-18 was a prototype American subscale RPV built for the US Army Air Forces in the mid-1940s.

Development
The OQ-18 was a short-endurance drone and larger than other OQ-series drones. In 1945, the OQ-18 was built and tested by the USAAF, but never entered production.

Specification

See also

References

1940s United States special-purpose aircraft
Unmanned aerial vehicles of the United States
Radioplane aircraft